Bombella intestini is a bacterium from the genus of Bombella which has been isolated from bumblebee crop.

References

Further reading 
 

Rhodospirillales
Bacteria described in 2015